Jordanian Revolutionary People's Party was a political party in Jordan. It was founded by the Jordanian sympathizers of the Popular Front for the Liberation of Palestine (PFLP). The party was the Jordanian section of the Arab Socialist Action Party. The party was later dissolved and its members joined the PFLP.

See also
 List of political parties in Jordan

References

Arab nationalism in Jordan
Arab Nationalist Movement breakaway groups
Arab socialist political parties
Defunct socialist parties in Jordan
Pan-Arabist political parties
Political parties with year of disestablishment missing
Political parties with year of establishment missing
Popular Front for the Liberation of Palestine
1974 establishments in Jordan
1980s disestablishments in Jordan